, also translated as 36 Clans of the Min-People or 36 Min families, was a general designation of a number of Chinese bureaucrats and craftsmen who emigrated from Fujian to the Ryukyu Kingdom under the orders of the Ming Chinese Emperor. They and their descendants lived in the community of Kumemura and served as government officials at home, and as diplomats in relations with China, Japan, and others.

References

Ryukyuan people of Chinese descent
Foreign relations of the Ryukyu Kingdom